Hope Runs High is an American film distribution company. They began preserving and distributing out-of-print documentary films digitally before expanding to narrative and first-run theatrical films. A unique element of their library is that much of it focuses on films by women, people of color, and LGBTQ+ filmmakers and subjects. The company also houses a small record label that releases movie soundtracks and film scores.

Background
Hope Runs High acquired the distribution rights for a library of acclaimed documentary films. This collection included films from Academy Award-winning actress/director Lee Grant, including her 1986 Best Documentary Feature winner Down and Out in America, as well as filmmaker Richard Morris' Oscar-shortlisted musical documentary Wallowitch & Ross: This Moment. Many of these films feature LGBTQ+ characters and were not seen in mainstream cinema at the time of their original release, rescuing and showcasing a unique corner of queer cinema.

In 2019, Hope Runs High began to refocus on theatrical distribution, beginning with a limited theatrical re-release of documentaries by Grant. Grant's films launched as part of a retrospective at New York's Film Forum and marked the first retrospective of her work to look at her time as both actor and director, and the first time many of the films had been exhibited in decades.

Having begun with film preservation, some of the company's work deals with film history. Many of their digital releases include supplementary content designed to provide further cultural and historical context for the viewer.

COVID-19/Virtual Cinema
An expansion of Grant's documentaries to art house and repertory cinemas was cut short by the COVID-19 pandemic. In response, the re-release of Grant's films was redesigned as one of the earliest examples of a virtual cinema release. The collection of Grant's documentaries was curated for virtual cinemas by Taylor A. Purdee and has become the first virtual retrospective in the United States, as well as the largest series on Grant's directorial work.

Subsequently, it was announced that the American Film Institute would honor Grant's lifetime achievements specifically as a documentarian during its 2020 AFI Docs film festival with a digital showing of Grant's Down and Out in America accompanying the celebration. This is the first time the festival has been held virtually, due to the pandemic.

Also during the COVID-19 crisis, Hope Runs High brought Jonathan Caouette's 2003 documentary Tarnation to digital streaming for the first time in collaboration with The Criterion Collection. The film premiered June 1, 2020 in celebration of (a much changed) Pride Month.

References

External links
  
 
 
 

Film distributors of the United States
American record labels